Dodanim Barboza-García (born December 4, 1993 in Aguachica) is a judoka from Colombia.

Bio

Dodanim lives and in Aguachica, Cesar. His father is president of local club "Judo del Cesar" where he trains.

Although  he is very young so he has a lot of international experiences. He usually visiting judo training camps in Spain and in other countries.

In 2007 he was chosen as the best youth judoka of America (UPJ).

Judo

He won silver medal on Pan American Judo Championships  in non-Olympic super lightweight category to 55 kg.

Achievements

References

External links 
 
 Facebook (logged)

Colombian male judoka
Living people
1993 births
People from Cesar Department